Thameed, also Thimeed, Arabic الثميد is a remote township in Sharjah, United Arab Emirates (UAE). It is part of Al Madam municipality and is located between Dubai and Hatta, off the Dhaid/Madam highway (E55). It has a police station.

As of 2017-07-01, Thameed had an estimated population of 1,650.

References 

Populated places in the Emirate of Sharjah